The 11th Parliament of Kenya was the meeting of the legislative branch of the national government of Kenya, which began on 28 March 2013. It is the first Parliament to incorporate the structural reforms laid out in the 2010 Constitution. The constitution re-established the Senate and increased the size of the National Assembly from 224 seats to 349 seats.

In the 2013 parliamentary elections, the Jubilee Alliance won a majority of seats in both the National Assembly and the Senate.

Major events
 Jubilee signed post-election coalition agreements with the New Ford Kenya, Alliance Party of Kenya, Chama Cha Uzalendo, People Democratic Party, Ford People, and Kenya African National Union. Reports indicate that there are currently 212 Members of the National Assembly who have agreed to work with the Jubilee Alliance.
 On 1 March 2013, the Salaries and Remuneration Commission gazetted salary and benefits for state officers in the executive, parliament, constitutional commissions, independent offices, and county governments. The notice reduced salaries for Members of Parliament from 851,000 Ksh to 532,500 Ksh per month. On 28 May 2013, the National Assembly unanimously voted to adopt the recommendations of the Committee on Delegated Legislation, finding that the SRC's notices were "unconstitutional, unlawful, ultra vires and therefore null and void." On 12 June 2013, the SRC and the Parliamentary Service Commission agreed to maintain the reduced salaries, allowed for annual pay increases, and increased other allowances and benefits.
 In November 2013, the parliament moved a motion to remove the cabinet secretary for Land, Housing and Urban Development, Charity Ngilu on grounds that she breached the Kenyan constitution by making some appointments at the ministry. She was accused of appointing the director-general without involving the parliament which is a requirement of the law.

Party summary

Senate

National Assembly

Leadership
Senate

 Speaker — Ekwee Ethuro
 Deputy Speaker — Kembi Gitura

Majority (Jubilee) leadership
 Majority Leader — Kindiki Kithure
 Deputy Majority Leader — Charles Keter
 Majority Chief Whip — Susan Kihika
 Majority Deputy Chief Whip — Mike Sonko

Minority (CORD) leadership
 Minority Leader — Moses Wetangula
 Deputy Minority Leader — Hassan Abdurrahman
 Minority Chief Whip — Johnstone Muthama
 Minority Deputy Chief Whip — Janet Ongera

National Assembly
 Speaker — Justin Muturi
 Deputy Speaker — Joyce Laboso

Majority (Jubilee) leadership
 Majority Leader — Aden Duale
 Deputy Majority Leader — Naomi Shaban
 Majority Chief Whip — Katoo ole Metito
 Majority Deputy Chief Whip — Benjamin Washiali

Minority (CORD) leadership
 Minority Leader — Francis Mwanzia Nyenze
 Deputy Minority Leader — Jakoyo Midiwo
 Minority Chief Whip — Thomas Ludindi Mwadeghu
 Minority Deputy Chief Whip — Chris Wamalwa

Members

Senate

National Assembly

Committees

Senate 

House Keeping Committees
Rules and Business Committee
Chair — Ekwee Ethuro
Liaison Committee

Standing/Portfolio Committees
Committee on Education, Information and Technology
Chair — Mutahi Kagwe (NARC)
Vice Chair — Mohamud Halima Abdille (ODM)
Committee on Energy, Roads and Transportation
Chair — Gideon Moi (KANU)
Vice Chair — Mwakulegwa Danson Mwazo (ODM)
Committee on Finance, Commerce and Economic Affairs
Chair — Billow Kerrow (URP)
Vice Chair — Peter Mositet (TNA)
Committee on Health, Labour and Social Welfare
Chair — Mohammed Kuti (URP)
Vice Chair — Kittony Zipporah (KANU)
Committee on Legal Affairs and Human Rights
Chair — Amos Wako (ODM)
Vice Chair — Sang Stephen (URP)
Committee on National Security and Foreign Relations
Chair — Yusuf Haji (TNA)
Vice Chair — Dullo Fatuma (URP)
Committee on Agriculture, Land and Natural Resources
Chair — Kivuti Lenny (APK)
Vice Chair — George Khaniri (UDF)

Sessional Committees
Delegated Legislation Committee
Chair — Kisasa Mshenga Mvita (URP)
Vice Chair — Sijeny Judith Achieng (WDM-K)
Senate Implementation Committee
Chair — James Orengo (ODM)
Vice Chair — Kanainza Nyongesa Daisy (ODM)
Devolved Government Committee
Chair — Murkomen Kipchumba (URP)
Vice Chair — Wangari Martha (UDF)

National Assembly 

House Keeping Committees
House Business Committee
Chair — Justin Muturi
Committee on Selection
Chair — Aden Duale (URP)
Vice Chair — Francis Nyenze
Procedure and House Rules Committee
Chair — Justin Muturi
Liaison Committee
Chair — Joyce Laboso
Catering and Health Club Committee
Chair — Janet Nangabo Wanyama
Vice Chair — Elijah Lagat

Standing Committees
Committee on Appointments
Chair — Justin Muturi
Public Accounts Committee
Chair — Nicholas Gumbo ( Rarieda )
Vice Chair — Jackson Rop ( Kipkelion west, URP )
Public Investments Committee
Chair — Adan Keynan
Vice Chair — Kimani Ichung'wah
Budget and Appropriations Committee
Chair — Mutava Musyimi
Vice Chair — Mary Emaase
Committee on Implementation
Chair — Roselinda Soipan
Vice Chair — David Gikaria
Committee on Delegated Legislation
Chair — William Cheptumo
Vice Chair — Joseph Gitari
Committee on Regional Integration
Chair — Florence Kajuju
Vice Chair — Christopher Nakuleu

Departmental Committees
Defence and Foreign Relations Committee
Chair — Ndungu Gethenji
Vice Chair — Elias Bare Shill
Administration and National Security Committee
Chair — Asman Kamama
Vice Chair — Alois Lentoimanga
Agriculture, Livestock and Cooperatives Committee
Chair — Ayub Savula
Vice Chair — Kareke Mbiuki
Environment and Natural Resources Committeemembers
Chair — Amina Abdalla
Vice Chair — Alexander Kosgey
Education, Research and Technology Committee
Chair — Sabina Chege
Vice Chair — Julius Melly
Energy, Communication and Information Committee
Chair — Jamleck Kamau
Vice Chair — Jackson Kiptanui
Finance, Planning and Trade Committee
Chair — Benjamin Langat
Vice Chair — Nelson Gaichuhie
Health Committee
Chair — Rachel Nyamai
Vice Chair — Robert Pukose
Justice and Legal Affairs Committee
Chair — Samuel Chepkong'a
Vice Chair — Priscilla Nyokabi
Labour and Social Welfare Committee
Chair — David Were
Vice Chair — Tiyah Galgalo
Lands Committee
Chair — Alex Mwiru
Vice Chair — Moses Ole Sakuda
Transport, Public Works and Housing Committee
Chair — Maina Kamanda
Vice Chair — Amb. M. Maalim

Other Committees
Committee on Constituency Development Fund
Chair — Moses Lessonet
Vice Chair — Esther Gathogo
Constitution Implementation Oversight Committee
Chair — Njoroge Baiya
Vice Chair — Joyce Akai Emanikor
Pensions Committee
Chair — Justin Muturi

Joint Committees 

Committee on National Cohesion and Equal Opportunity
Committee on Parliamentary Broadcasting and Library

Administrative officers
 Parliamentary Joint Services Director General — Clement Nyandiere
 Parliamentary Joint Services - Litigation and Compliance Director — Anthony Thiong'o Njoroge
 Centre for Parliamentary Studies and Training Director — Nyokabi Kamau
 Finance and Accounting Services Director — Paul Onyangoh
 Information and Research Services Director — Paul Ngetich
 Chief, Security and Safety — Solomon Obange
 Maintenance and Buildings Chief Engineer — Eng. Pius Kioko
 Commission Secretariat Head — Shadia Fary
 Internal Audit Head — Amos Guchu (acting)

Senate
 Clerk — Jeremiah Nyegenye
 Senior Deputy Clerk — Consolata Waithera Munga
 Legal Services Director — Eunice Gichangi
 Committee Services Director — Samuel Njenga Njuguna
 Legislative and Procedural Services Director — Serah Kioko
 Speaker's Office Director — Mohammed Ali Mohammed
 Chief Serjeant-at-Arms — Maj. (Rtd) Samson Sorobit
 Hansard Editor — Gladys Ingoyi Ndenda

National Assembly
 Clerk — Michael Silai
 Senior Deputy Clerk — Michael Rotich Sialai
 Legal Services Director — Jeremiah Ndombi
 Committee Services Director — Florence Abonyo
 Committee Services Deputy Director- Peter Chemweno
 Legislative and Procedural Services Director — James Mwangi
 Legislative and Procedural Services Deputy Director - Samuel Njoroge
 Speaker's Office Director — Nancy Mukunya
 Chief Serjeant-at-Arms — Aloisie Lekulo
 Hansard Editor — Jeremiah Kiema

Notes

External links
Parliament of Kenya

References

Politics of Kenya
Kenyan parliaments
2013 in Kenya
2014 in Kenya
2015 in Kenya
2016 in Kenya